Smooth Christmas may refer to:

 Smooth Christmas, a UK radio station dedicated to Christmas music, replaced by Smooth 70s
 A Smooth Jazz Christmas, a 2001 album by saxophone player Dave Koz